Giovanni Devoti (born at Rome, 11 July 1744; died there 18 September 1820) was an Italian canon lawyer and bishop.

Life
At the age of twenty he occupied a chair of canon law at the Sapienza University of Rome. After twenty-five years service in this position Pope Pius VI appointed him Bishop of Anagni.

He resigned the see in 1804, to become titular Archbishop of Carthage, As such he filled several important positions at Rome. He also accompanied Pope Pius VII during his exile in France.

Works

His works are: 

"De notissimis in jure legibus libri duo" (Rome, 1766);
"Juris canonici universi publici et privati libri quinque", an unfinished work of which only three volumes appeared (Rome, 1803–1815; new edition, Rome, 1827), containing an introduction to canon law and a commentary on the first and second book of the Decretals; 
"Institutionum canonicarum libri quatuor" (Rome, 1785; fourth ed., Rome, 1814). 

The last work is distinguished by its clearness and conciseness, and by its numerous historical notes, attributed, but without any reason, to Cardinal Francesco Saverio Castiglioni, afterwards Pope Pius VIII. In 1817, the King of Spain made obligatory the study of the "Institutiones" of Devoti at the University of Alcalá; and in 1836, the University of Louvain accepted it as a classical manual of canon law. The work subsequently became more useful for the history than for the practice of canon law.

References

Attribution
 The entry cites:
SCHULTE, Geschichte der Quellen und Litteratur des canonischen Rechts (Stuttgart, 1880), III, 1, 528; 
HURTER, Nomenclator Literarius (1895), III, 677; 
Wernz, Jus Decretalium (Rome, 1898), I, 401.

1744 births
1820 deaths
Clergy from Rome
Canon law jurists
Bishops of Anagni
18th-century Italian Roman Catholic bishops
19th-century Italian Roman Catholic archbishops
18th-century Italian jurists
Lawyers from Rome